Terence Caldwell (born 5 December 1938) is an English former professional footballer who made nearly 400 appearances in the Football League playing as a defender for Huddersfield Town, Leeds United, Carlisle United and Barrow.

References

1938 births
Living people
Footballers from Wakefield
English footballers
Association football defenders
Huddersfield Town A.F.C. players
Leeds United F.C. players
Carlisle United F.C. players
Barrow A.F.C. players
Wakefield F.C. players